Yalutorovsky (masculine), Yalutorovskaya (feminine), or Yalutorovskoye (neuter) may refer to:

Yalutorovsky District, a district of Tyumen Oblast, Russia
Yalutorovsky, former name of the town of Yalutorovsk, Tyumen Oblast, Russia